"I'm Just Wild About Animal Crackers" is a 1926 novelty song by Fred Rich, Harry Link, and Sam Coslow. It was first recorded by Irving Aaronson and his Commanders. Around the release of the song, A&P Stores and Henry Waterson Inc. arranged to sell a copy of the song and a box of animal crackers together for 25 cents.

Notable recordings
Mel Blanc and the Sportsmen with Billy May's Orchestra 
The Six Jumping Jacks
Harry Reser and Seven Wild Men 
Irving Aaronson and his Commanders
Duke Ellington and His Washingtonians 
The California Ramblers

References

Foxtrots
1926 songs
Songs with music by Harry Link
Songs written by Sam Coslow